Great Warford is a civil parish in Cheshire East, England. It contains six buildings that are recorded in the National Heritage List for England as designated listed buildings.  Of these, one is listed at Grade II*, the middle grade, and the others are at Grade II.  Apart from the village of Great Warford, the parish is almost entirely rural.  The listed buildings consist of a house, a cottage, a farmhouse, a Chapel, the most spectacular is Highgrove built in 1903 as a Convalescent home for Ancoats Hospital in Manchester and its lodge after which the road is named.

Key

Buildings

See also

Listed buildings in Chorley
Listed buildings in Little Warford
Listed buildings in Marthall
Listed buildings in Mobberley
Listed buildings in Nether Alderley

References
Citations

Sources

 

 

Listed buildings in the Borough of Cheshire East
Lists of listed buildings in Cheshire